{{DISPLAYTITLE:C16H22ClN3O2}}
The molecular formula C16H22ClN3O2 (molar mass: 323.82 g/mol, exact mass: 323.1401 u) may refer to:

 Renzapride
 Tebuconazole

Molecular formulas